Pleasant Hill may refer to:
Pleasant Hill, Cass County, Texas
Pleasant Hill, Cherokee County, Texas
Pleasant Hill, Eastland County, Texas
Pleasant Hill, Fort Bend County, Texas
Pleasant Hill, Hopkins County, Texas
Pleasant Hill, Houston County, Texas
Pleasant Hill, Lamar County, Texas
Pleasant Hill, Live Oak County, Texas
Pleasant Hill, McLennan County, Texas
Pleasant Hill, Milam County, Texas
Pleasant Hill, Nacogdoches County, Texas
Pleasant Hill, Polk County, Texas
Pleasant Hill, San Augustine County, Texas
Pleasant Hill, Smith County, Texas
Pleasant Hill, Travis County, Texas
Pleasant Hill, Upshur County, Texas
Pleasant Hill, Van Zandt County, Texas
Pleasant Hill, Washington County, Texas
Pleasant Hill, Williamson County, Texas
Pleasant Hill, Yoakum County, Texas